Carex fastigiata is a tussock-forming species of perennial sedge in the family Cyperaceae. It is native to parts of Tibet, Nepal and China.

See also
List of Carex species

References

fastigiata
Taxa named by Adrien René Franchet
Plants described in 1895
Flora of China
Flora of Nepal
Flora of Tibet